The Anomaly is a 2014 British science fiction action thriller film co-written, directed by and starring Noel Clarke and also featuring Ian Somerhalder and Luke Hemsworth. The film was panned by critics.

Plot
Ex-soldier Ryan Reeve wakes up in the back of a moving van next to a young tied-up boy, Alex, who is being held prisoner. Strangely, the boy seems to think Reeve is the kidnapper though he has no memory of ever having seen the boy before and looking at his watch, he last remembered it being six months previously. After freeing the boy, making a run for it, and attempting to figure out what has happened to him, all he remembers was being at a facility treating his severe PTSD. As one of their pursuers catches up to them, suddenly he blacks out again and awakes in a room with a mysterious young man (same as before) named Harkin Langham, who seems to think he is someone else.

When Langham discovers who he really is, he disables Reeve and knocks him out. Reeve then wakes up in a mysterious bedroom having sex with a beautiful young woman. She identifies herself as a prostitute named Dana, who seems to remember meeting and engaging in sexual activity with a much more violent and sociopathic version of Reeve.  He tries to explain his predicament, but she remains skeptical. He asks her to come with him, but she says she cannot leave as she is the "property" of a Russian gangster named Sergio. Reeve offers to free her if she will help him solve the mystery that his life has become. The two manage to escape, but Reeve again loses consciousness when the mind control system reboots and again Langham catches up to him.

He must work out what is happening in bursts of exactly nine minutes and forty-seven seconds, as the control and conscious awareness of his body is repeatedly being hijacked and shuffled through different scenarios by person/s unknown. He teams up with Dana as he battles a conspiracy in mind control known as "Anomaly" led by Langham. Langham, meanwhile, urges him to stop fighting it, as it has nothing to do with him, however, he is convinced otherwise.

Cast
Noel Clarke as Pvt. Ryan Reeve/Anomaly #66
Alexis Knapp as Dana
Brian Cox as Dr. Francis Langham
Ian Somerhalder as Agent Harkin Langham/Anomaly #X
Rachael Jowett as Margaret
Luke Hemsworth as Agent Richard Elkin/Anomaly #13
Ali Cook as Agent Travis/Anomaly #97
Art Parkinson as Alex
John Schwab as Harrison Samuel
Michael Bisping as Sergio

Production
The film was produced in the United Kingdom in 2013. Clarke performed his own stunts, modifying his diet and receiving fight training for the purpose.

Distribution
The first official trailer was released on 19 April 2014. The film was shown at the Edinburgh International Film Festival in June 2014 and entered general release in the UK and the Republic of Ireland through Universal Pictures on 4 July.

Reception
The film was unanimously panned by critics, with a Rotten Tomatoes approval rating of 0% based on 17 reviews, making it the worst reviewed British film of 2014. On Metacritic, it has a score of 27 out of 100 from 7 critics, indicating "generally unfavorable reviews". Mark Kermode of The Observer called it "ambitious but uneven". Other critics described it as "hilariously naff science-fiction mularkey" and "a peculiar Brit flick best described as a noble failure" and referred to "tangled conception and tortuously opaque execution" and to "meag[re] rewards for those willing to endure its laborious convolutions".

References

External links

2014 films
2014 action thriller films
2014 science fiction action films
2010s British films
2010s chase films
2010s English-language films
2010s mystery films
2010s science fiction thriller films
British action thriller films
British chase films
British mystery films
British science fiction action films
British science fiction thriller films
Films about security and surveillance
Films directed by Noel Clarke
Films set in the future
Techno-thriller films
Universal Pictures films